Vedapuriswarar Temple, Thiruvedhikudi or Vazhaimadunathar Temple is a Hindu temple dedicated to Shiva located in Thiruvedhikudi near Tiruvaiyaru, Tamil Nadu, India. The presiding deity is revered in the 7th century Tamil Saiva canonical work, the Tevaram, written by Tamil poet saints known as the nayanars and classified as Paadal Petra Sthalam. The temple is counted as the earliest of all Chola temples.

There are many inscriptions associated with the temple indicating contributions from Cholas, Thanjavur Nayaks and Thanjavur Maratha kingdom. The oldest parts of the present masonry structure were built during the Chola dynasty in the 9th century, while later expansions, including the towering gopuram gatehouses, are attributed to later periods, up to the Thanjavur Nayaks during the 16th century.

The temple complex is one of the largest in the state and it houses four gateway towers known as gopurams. The temple has numerous shrines, with those of Vedapuriswarar and Mangayarkarasi being the most prominent. The temple complex houses many halls and three precincts; the most notable is the second precinct built during the Vijayanagar period that has many sculptures. The temple has six daily rituals at various times from 5:30 a.m. to 10 p.m., and twelve yearly festivals on its calendar. The temple is maintained and administered by Hindu Religious and Charitable Endowments Department of the Government of Tamil Nadu.

Legend

God was emanating from banana tank and hence called Vazhaimadu nathar.  Lingam here is called Vedapuriswarar. The Pranava manthra "OM" came here and worshiped Lord Shiva, where ever the Pranavam goes the Vedha will follow, hence Pranava manthra "OM" consider to be the peak in Vedhas, because  all Vedhas worshiped the lord here, this place is called as Vedhikudi. This is the place where Lord Shiva collected Vethiar (priest) for Nandhi's Marriage. As per another legend, a Chola king was praying for his daughter's marriage for a long time. By the grace of Mangayarkarasi, the presiding deity of the temple, the king's daughter got married. He renamed her daughter Mangayarakarasi. As per another legend, Vedhi in Tamil means Brahma. Since Brahma worshiped Shiva in the place, it came to be known as Thiruvedhikudi.

Architecture
The temple is revered by the hymns of 7th century Tamil saint poets, Appar and Sambandar.  The temple lies on Kudamurutti river on the Thiruvayyaru - Thanjavur road. The temple faces east and is entered via a three-tiered pyramidal rajagopuram (gateway tower). The presiding deity in the form of lingam is housed in the sanctum in square shape. The attached hall, the ardhamandapa measures the same width as the sanctum, while its length is twice the sanctum. The ardhamandapa projects towards the east. The Mukhamandapa has a square structure. The shrine of Mangayarkarasi faces south. The Mahamandapa houses the image of Vedha Vinagayar who is sported in a posture hearing the four Vedas from Shiva. Since Shiva is believed to have appeared from plantain tree, he is also called Vazhaimadunathar. The temple is maintained and administered by Hindu Religious and Charitable Endowments Department of the Government of Tamil Nadu.

Religious importance
Tirugnana Sambandar, a 7th-century Tamil Saivite poet, venerated Vedhapureeswarar in two padigams in Tevaram, compiled as the Third Tirumurai. Appar, a contemporary of Sambandar, also venerated Vedhapureeswarar in two padigams in Tevaram, compiled in the fourth Tirumurai. As the temple is revered in Tevaram, it is classified as Paadal Petra Sthalam, one of the 275 temples that find mention in the Saiva canon. The temple is counted as the 52nd in the list of temples in the northern banks of Cauvery.

This one of the Saptha sthana Sthalam, this is Third in order. Brahma is said to have worshiped Lord Shiva at this Sthalam (place). Sun's rays fall on the Sivalingam at sunrise on 13th, 14th and 15th day of Tamil month Panguni every year. It is believed that Sun god Sooriyan performs pooja during these 3 days to Lord Shiva at this sthalam. This place is a "Thirumana Thiruthalam". It is said to be that Thirugnanasampanthar had obtained the vision of Lord's marriage. Saint Campantar, while worshiping the Lord of the temple, sang his pathigam (10 versus) hymn, viz "Neeruvari ada". This is one of the few hymns, where the Sambandar ends it on the note( Aras aalwar Aaney namadhey), meaning he swears upon the King of Kings. In the seventh verse, of this song, Saint Sambandar, mentions, the Lord's Mercy on all those aspiring for most auspicious wedding.

"கன்னியரோ டாடவர்கள்  மாமணம் விரும்பிய அருமங்கலமிக மின்னியலும் நுண்ணிடை நன் மங்கையரி யற்றுபதி வேதிகுடியே"

Literal translation of the two lines would be :
"The whole-hearted wishes of girls and boys,  be most auspiciously fulfilled. With Lightning speed, may one be blessed with a slim waist, good virtued bride."

The temple is counted as one of the temples built on the banks of River Kaveri.

Saptha Stanam

The sapthasthanam festival is conducted at Tiruvaiyaru during April every year. As per Hindu legend, it is the wedding festival of Nandikeswara, the sacred bull of Shiva on the Punarpoosa star during the Tamil month of Panguni. The festival deity of Aiyarappar temple of Thiruvaiyaru is carried in a decorated glass palanquin along with the images of Nandikeswara and Suyasayambikai to the temples in Thirupazhanam, Thiruchottruthurai, Thiruvedhikudi, Thirukandiyur and Thirupoonthurthi. Each of the festival deities of the respective temples mounted in glass palanquins accompany Aiyarppar on the way to the final destiny, Thillaistanam. There is a grand display of fireworks in Cauvery riverbed outside Thillaistanam temple. The seven palanquins are carried to Aiyarappar temple in Thiruvaiyyaru. Hundreds of people witness the convergence of seven glass palanquins carrying principal deities of respective temples from seven places at Tiruvaiyaru. The devotees perform Poochorithal(flower festival) in which a doll offers flowers to the principal deities in the palanquins. After the Poochorithal, the palanquins leave for their respective temples.

Worship practices

The temple priests perform the puja (rituals) during festivals and on a daily basis. Like other Shiva temples of Tamil Nadu, the priests belong to the Shaiva community, a Brahmin sub-caste. The temple rituals are performed five times a day; Ushathkalam at 6:30 a.m., Kalasanthi at 8:00 a.m., Uchikalam at 12:00 a.m., Sayarakshai at 5:00 p.m., and Ardha Jamam at 8:00 p.m. Each ritual comprises four steps: abhisheka (sacred bath), alangaram (decoration), naivethanam (food offering) and deepa aradanai (waving of lamps) for both Vedapureeswarar and Mangayarkarasi. The worship is held amidst music with nagaswaram (pipe instrument) and tavil (percussion instrument), religious instructions in the Vedas (sacred texts) read by priests and prostration by worshipers in front of the temple mast. Mahashivaratri during February - March is the major festivals celebrated in the temple. The major festival in the region and the temple is the Sapthastanam festival.

Notes

References

External links

Shiva temples in Thanjavur district
Padal Petra Stalam